opened in Naha, Okinawa Prefecture, Japan, in 2006. The collection includes the National Treasure Materials relating to the Shō Family of Ryūkyū Kings. The digital museum was launched in 2014.

See also
 Okinawa Prefectural Museum
 List of Historic Sites of Japan (Okinawa)
 List of Cultural Properties of Japan - historical materials (Okinawa)
 List of Cultural Properties of Japan - writings (Okinawa)
 List of Cultural Properties of Japan - paintings (Okinawa)
 Gusuku Sites and Related Properties of the Kingdom of Ryukyu

References

External links
  Naha City Museum of History
  Digital Museum
  Naha City Museum of History

Museums in Okinawa Prefecture
History museums in Japan
Naha
Museums established in 2006
2006 establishments in Japan